Confederate Railroad (originally known as "Confederate RR") is an American country rock band founded in 1987 in Marietta, Georgia, by Danny Shirley (lead vocals), Michael Lamb (lead guitar), Mark Dufresne (drums), Chris McDaniel (keyboards), Warren "Gates" Nichols (steel guitar), and Wayne Secrest (bass guitar). After serving as a backing band for outlaw country acts David Allan Coe and Johnny Paycheck, the band signed to a recording contract with Atlantic Records, releasing their self-titled debut album that year. In the 1990s, they released four more albums for Atlantic.

Confederate Railroad has released six studio albums. In addition, 18 of their singles have entered the Billboard Hot Country Songs charts.

The band's most recent studio album, Lucky to Be Alive, was issued on the D&B Masterworks label on July 15, 2016. The band released their first live album, Confederate Railroad Live: Back to the Barrooms, on the E1 Music label on June 15, 2010.

History
Confederate Railroad was founded in 1987 by Danny Shirley, Michael Lamb, Gates Nichols (May 26, 1944 – August 14, 2009), Chris McDaniel, Wayne Secrest (April 29, 1950 – June 2, 2018), and Mark Dufresne. The six members began playing at bars in and around Atlanta, Georgia, and Augusta, Georgia. Over time, they also worked as a road band for David Allan Coe and Johnny Paycheck. Shirley had previously been signed to the Amor record label as a solo singer, charting five times on the country charts between 1984 and 1988.

After several years in the Atlanta area, the band signed with Atlantic Records in 1992 and released its self-titled debut album. The album produced six hit singles and was certified 2× Platinum in the U.S. In 1993, Confederate Railroad was awarded Best New Group at the ACM awards. In order of release, these singles were "She Took It Like a Man", "Jesus and Mama", "Queen of Memphis" (their highest chart peak, at No. 2), "When You Leave That Way You Can Never Go Back", "Trashy Women" and "She Never Cried".

Notorious was the band's second album. Released in 1994, it was certified platinum as well. The album was led off by the No. 9 "Daddy Never Was the Cadillac Kind", followed by the No. 20 "Elvis and Andy" and finally "Summer in Dixie", which failed to make Top 40. Also in 1994, Shirley and Mark Collie co-wrote and sang guest vocals on Billy Ray Cyrus's "Redneck Heaven", an album cut from his 1994 disc Storm in the Heartland.

One year later, the band released its third album, 1995's When and Where. This album failed to sell as well as its predecessors, and was less successful on the charts as well. Lead-off single "When and Where" reached No. 24, while the other three singles – "Bill's Laundromat, Bar and Grill", "When He Was My Age", and "See Ya" – all failed to reach Top 40. A Greatest Hits package followed in 1996.

In 1998, the band released its fourth and final studio album for Atlantic, titled Keep on Rockin'''. Its only two singles were "The Big One" and "Cowboy Cadillac", both of which failed to reach the Top 60 on the country singles charts. After another compilation titled Rockin' Country Party Pack (which produced another chart single in "Toss a Little Bone", previously from When and Where), the band exited Atlantic.

One year later, Confederate Railroad signed to Audium/Koch Records (now E1 Music) for its fifth studio album, Unleashed. It was led off by the No. 39 "What Brothers Do". Although this was the band's first Top 40 country hit since "When and Where" in 1995, the other singles – "She Treats Her Body Like a Temple" and "White Trash with Money" – both failed to reach Top 40.

The band did not record again until 2007's Cheap Thrills, an album of cover songs. This album was led off by a cover of "Please Come to Boston", which failed to chart.

Confederate Railroad members signed a record deal with E1 Music in 2010 and released their first-ever live album called "Confederate Railroad Live: Back to the Barrooms". Cody McCarver of Confederate Railroad also signed to the label and has recently had success with Confederate Railroad's song "White Trash with Money" which was written by Confederate Railroad's Danny Shirley with songwriter Buck Moore. The video by Cody also featured Jimmy Dormire who left Confederate Railroad in 2008. Cody McCarver released a single and video called "I'm America".

Since 2019, the band has missed bookings and had concerts cancelled because of concerns over the band's name and their logo's inclusion of two Confederate flags. In cancelling their planned performance at the Ulster County Fair, organizers said the event must "(represent) the values of all members of our community" and that "showcasing of a symbol of division and racism runs counter to that principle".

Critics say that the Confederate flag is a racist symbol, representing a war to continue slavery and racial segregation in the United States. The band said the cancellation was "very disappointing". Shirley says the flag represents history and Southern heritage.

Shirley blamed Governor J.B. Pritzker's cancellation of the band from the DuQuoin State Fair lineup on political correctness, which he says is focused on the band's name. The governor's office said that state resources could not be used "to promote symbols of racism", specifying the Confederate flag in the group's logo.

Shirley suffered a broken back on April 1, 2021.

In 2022, the band continues touring the Country as a 4-piece band, with Shirley on Lead Vocals & Guitar, Rusty Hendrix on Lead Guitar, Mo Thaxton on Bass & sometimes Lead Vocals, and Mark DuFresne on Drums.

Musical stylings
Described vocally as a "gruff, reliable twanger", lead singer Danny Shirley cites outlaw country acts such as Waylon Jennings as his major influence. According to him, the band's music is "straight-ahead outlaw country", although their image has also drawn comparisons to Southern rock.

Confederate Railroad's novelty numbers, such as "Trashy Women", show a tongue-in-cheek sense of humor. A reviewer for New Country magazine wrote that they are "one of the few bands who can pull off a song about how they prefer trashy women and sound like they really mean it". A more serious side of the band is shown in their ballads. Those on Notorious, for instance, were described by New Country magazine as "show[ing] men left stunned and confused by a world that changed faster than they could follow".

Member changes
Lead guitarist Michael Lamb, one of the group's original members, left in the mid 1990s and was replaced with Jimmy Dormire.

Chris McDaniel, the original keyboardist, left and was replaced with Cody McCarver. McCarver has released a solo album, although he continued to tour as a member of Confederate Railroad up until his last performance with them at the Putnam County Fair in Eleanor, West Virginia on July 16, 2010. To Date, Cody has released 2 Country Music Albums & 4 Gospel Albums. He's also worked on some Western Independent Films and his most recent work was with John Schneider working on his album and being a Co-Star in his movie "Stand on It" as well as the Sequel "Poker Run". He is currently on the Road touring with John Schneider in his band where he also Opens the Show with his own music.

In June 2008, Jimmy Dormire announced that he was leaving Confederate Railroad to continue his solo career, though he continues as a member of Cody McCarver's band. Dormire was subsequently replaced by Rusty Hendrix, former side man for Mark Wills and Sammy Kershaw. Jimmy was part of the Cody McCarver band, and became a regular in the John Schneider band before joining to Country Band BlackHawk and the Outlaws as a Full time Member.

Gates Nichols retired from Confederate Railroad in December 2008, and in July of the following year, he was diagnosed with pancreatic cancer. He died from the disease on the morning of August 14, 2009, at the age of 65. Nearly two years later, in January 2011, Bobby Randall joined Confederate Railroad, playing steel guitar and fiddle for 6 years until his departure in 2017.

In October 2014, Mo Thaxton joined the group on the baritone, bass and vocals. Thaxton was a member of the group Dr. Hook for 12 years prior to joining Confederate Railroad.

Joey Recker began playing piano with the group in January 2017 after 28 years in the Armed Forces. He continued on with Confederate Railroad until he decided to depart the band December 2021 to be closer to his family and focus on his faith. He fronts the Joey & Shug Duo that does Local Music and a Southern Gospel Band called Antioch-Southern Gospel.

Bassist Wayne Secrest retired from the band in October 2017. He died on June 2, 2018 after a long illness, at the age of 68.

Solo work
In addition to his work in the band, frontman Danny Shirley made a guest appearance alongside Mark Collie on the song "Redneck Heaven" from Billy Ray Cyrus' 1994 album Storm in the Heartland'', a song which Collie and Shirley co-wrote.
Danny Shirley has released 3 Albums Prior to starting the Confederate Railroad Band. His first "Local Legend" was released in 1984 on Amor Records. His second "Far from Over" and third "I make the Living" albums was released in 1990 also on Amor. Danny released a 2 CD Album featuring several of the songs from those 3 albums called "The Pyramid Collection" in 2005.

Cody McCarver released a self-titled solo album for the Aspirion label in 2006, which produced the singles "Red Flag" and "Through God's Eyes". He released another single, "Look What You've Done", in 2009. His 2010 single "White Trash With Money" was written by fellow band member Shirley along with songwriter Buck Moore. "White Trash With Money" was followed by "I'm America". Since recording 2 Country Albums, Cody went on to release 4 Gospel Albums and is currently acting in films along with John Schneider and playing in Schneider's Band.

Discography

Studio albums

Compilation and live albums

Singles

Music videos

References

External links 
 

American country rock groups
Country music groups from Georgia (U.S. state)
Musical groups established in 1987
Musical groups from Atlanta
Atlantic Records artists
MNRK Music Group artists
Naming controversies